College Football Risk, or CFBRisk, is a biennial collegiate strategy game that takes place during the spring and is inspired by the Hasbro Boardgame Risk.  Each season, more than 8,000 students and non-students participate, representing all NCAA Division I FBS schools in the United States. The game is a continuation of the popular game run by the college football subreddit, "r/CFB," on the social media site Reddit. CFBRisk first took place in the spring and summer of 2018. It is an MMOG-style game where college football fanbases compete for control of a fictionalized map of the United States. The goal is to control as much territory as possible for ultimate domination of the map. From season one forward, College Football Risk has been played independently from Reddit.

Gameplay

Premise
The concept of overtaking another team's territory spurs from a series of Reddit posts where users modified maps of the United States to illustrate a team's power, known as college football 'imperialism maps' or 'empires maps.' These were not based on the board game Risk, but the outcomes of college football games throughout the season.  Fanbases and news sites later pointed out the similarities to the Risk, and a game where fanbases themselves controlled the outcome (independently of their teams actual performance) was developed in the college football offseason. CFBRisk is played on a map of 131 territories in the United States, 130 of which represent the geographical home of NCAA Division I FBS schools and one additional territory designated for team Chaos. Initially, home territories were determined by which school is closest in straight-line distance to the geometric center of each county, but have now been adjusted as to reduce the overlap in state boundaries. The goal of the game is to expand your home team's territory and ultimately control the entire game map.  

Players affiliate with a school and have the option to make a single move every day.  Players either defend one of their own territories or attack an adjacent territory that is held by an enemy team.  Every night at 11PM EST, the results of each team's attack and defense are calculated for every territory, and the map updates based on which teams win each territory. Every team is assigned a point value based on the total number players from that team who attacked or defended a given territory and a random number generator (RNG) determines the victor. The odds of winning a given territory is found through the ratio of total points of each of the attacking teams and the defending team. A random player from the winning team of a territory is selected every round and designated as the MVP.

Star Power
Players gain power, known as Star Power by completing milestones within the game that fall into five categories.  A player's total star power is the median number of stars over all categories.  For instance, a player with star powers of 1-2-2-2-3 has a median value of 2.  The star power a player has represents a player's power multiplier when attacking or defending.  When attacking, a player's power points are designated to be 1 for a one-star, 2 for a two-star, 6 for a three-star, 12 for a four-star, and 24 for a five-star.  When defending, a player's power is 1.5x their power points.

The five star power categories are:
Total turns played in CFBRisk:
0 turns: One Star
10 turns: Two Stars
25 turns: Three Stars
50 turns: Four Stars
100 turns: Five Stars
Total turns played in the current season:
0 turns: One Star
5 turns: Two Stars
10 turns: Three Stars
25 turns: Four Stars
40 turns: Five Stars
Consecutive turns played:
0 turns: One Star
3 turns: Two Stars
5 turns: Three Stars
10 turns: Four Stars
25 turns: Five Stars
MVPs obtained:
0 MVPs: One Star
1 MVPs: Two Stars
5 MVPs: Three Stars
10 MVPs: Four Stars
25 MVPs: Five Stars
CFB Awards obtained:
0 Awards: One Star
1 Awards: Two Stars
2 Awards: Three Stars
3 Awards: Four Stars
4 Awards: Five Stars

Winning the Game
Although the object is for the entire map to be conquered, no team has accomplished the task to date.  The current method for selecting a winning team is to choose the team which has the most territories by the announced season end date.  The team that has come closest to obtaining complete conquest is the University of Florida, controlling 40 territories, or 31% of the map, in season one, day 63.

Team Chaos
Team Chaos is an extra team added to the game to allow for players to continue in gameplay after their home team is eliminated.  Chaos starts in the territory of Alaska, since no Division I FBS teams are located there.  When a team is eliminated, players are provided the option of either joining the team that holds their home territory or to join Team Chaos.  Players can also choose to begin the game with Chaos as their home team.  The gameplay mechanics for Chaos differ slightly from a normal team.  For instance, players in Chaos are provided no defense bonus, but are provided a random attack bonus, thereby encouraging the team to attack other territories and spread throughout the game.  Chaos cannot be eliminated; if the last remaining Chaos territory is conquered, the game randomly rolls against every other territory on the map until Chaos wins a territory.

Diplomacy
A key facet to success in CFBRisk is making and maintaining alliances with other teams.  Teams generally designate diplomatic leaders that can meet and confer with other teams to discuss collaborative strategy, attack enemy territories together, and define territorial boundaries.

Seasons

Season One - 2018
Season one lasted 66 days.  The winner of the season was determined by whichever team secured the most territories at the end of the season. A total of 119 teams were eliminated in season one, leaving only twelve teams remaining by day 66. Season one was the first to allow fanbases to control the map by making strategic moves rather than basing the outcome on the college football season.  Territories were also consolidated to include more than one county in a single territory, thus counties were eliminated as a measure of conquest.

Season Two - 2020
Season two was announced to last 50 days and began on March 23, 2020.  Only nine out of 131 teams remained at the end of the season.  The season winner was decided by the most territories held, making Ohio State University the victor. The team with the largest number of contiguous territories was the Aggies of Texas A&M University, which did not factor into results. The team with the most star power was the University of Michigan.

Season Three - 2023
Season Three began on January 20, 2023 and ended on March 13, 2023.  Season Three introduced a number of new innovations to revive the stagnant game, such as region bonuses and permanent mercenaries.  After Stanford's discovery of a massive number of bots that favored Michigan in the game, Michigan users Cros and Capn, along with Texas user Rogue, seized control of the game's Discord server and subreddit, kicking out all other moderators from other teams, including the game developer; so the game disaffiliated from the former Discord server and subreddit.

References

External links
Official web site

Risk (game)
College football in the United States
Virtual communities